20 Golden Greats is a compilation album by UK band The Shadows. It was released in 1977. The album was in UK charts for 43 weeks, where it gained number 1 position for 6 weeks.

The album was retitled 20 Greatest Hits for release in the Netherlands in 1980, where it reached number 2 on the album chart.

Track listing

Charts

Weekly charts

Year-end charts

Certifications and sales

References

The Shadows compilation albums
1977 albums
EMI America Records albums